Lintneria balsae is a moth of the  family Sphingidae. It is known from Mexico.

References

Lintneria
Moths described in 1932